The Torrington School District is a school district serving the city of Torrington in Litchfield County, Connecticut. 

Torrington Public Schools operates under the leadership of Superintendent Cheryl Kloczko and a board of education that consists of 10 elected members and the city mayor, who acts as the chairman ex officio. The district served 4,988 students in the 2004–2005 school year.

TPS About/Honors and awards
As of 2020 Torrington Public Schools (TPS) is the largest school district in Litchfeild County, Torrington enrolls over 5,000 students grades pre-k through 12.
Torrington teachers receive state level recognition, having been selected for awards such as State Teacher of the Year, Outstanding Teacher of the Gifted and Outstanding Middle School Art Teacher.  The district has been nationally ranked eight times as "One of the Best One Hundred Communities for Music Education" in the country.

Torrington Public Schools

High school (THS)
Torrington High School
Torrington High School students have been accepted at some of the most prestigious colleges and universities in our nation.

Middle schools (TMS)
Torrington Middle School

Forbes School
Forbes School

Southwest School
Southwest School

Torringford School
Torringford School

Vogel-Wetmore School
Vogel-Wetmore School

Special schools and programs
Alternate Special Education Programs (formerly Southeast School)
Homebound instruction

References 

"Distinguished Band, Winning Team: Torrington Can Crow" by Owen Canfield, The Hartford Courant, April 11, 2006, retrieved May 2, 2006

External links 
 
 Strategic School Profile 2004-05 for Torrington School District (PDF file)

Torrington, Connecticut
Education in Litchfield County, Connecticut
School districts in Connecticut